The M4 cycleway is a  shared use path for cyclists and pedestrians that is generally aligned with the M4 Motorway in Sydney, New South Wales, Australia. The eastern terminus of the cycleway is in Sydney Olympic Park, while the western terminus is in South Wentworthville.

Route

Sydney Olympic Park to Auburn
With an extensive network of on-road and shared paths located within Sydney Olympic Park, the cycleways eastern terminus is on Australia Avenue and continues west via the Holker Busway where the shared busway and on-road cycleway cross the Haslams Creek and meet with Hill Road. The path goes under the M4 and enters Lidcombe, initially as a segregated path and then joins Adderley Street East before joining a major intersection with Silverwater Road (A6), with traffic exiting the M4 from the east and entering the M4, heading west and limited cyclist and pedestrian protection on the traffic island.

The path continues along Adderley Street West, from Silverwater into , climbing to a roundabout at Stubbs Street, subject to heavy flows during peak traffic times. As the path continues further west it passes the former Roads & Maritime Services' toll plaza. The main path crosses the Duck River and continues further west. A spur path leads south, to the Great Western Highway (A44).

Auburn to Parramatta
The relatively scenic route on the northern shore of the Duck River carries the cycleway further west. Signs along the path explain the history of the industrial heartland of the area including a now-defunct Duck River ferry service that allowed passengers and freight to alight. In this ear, the path crosses former freight tracks. From Rosehill to Harris Park the path continues west towards Parramatta. The start of this path adjoins an L-plate motorcycle school and a small corkscrew climb to reach the bridge that runs overhead of James Ruse Drive and on the northern side of the M4. The bridge is a remarkable piece of industrial art and allows cyclists to be protected from the traffic. The path is secure at this stage and it winds down underneath the M4, above the Duck Creek and the A'Becketts Creek. The path runs through the middle of the M4 cement columns which forms a scenic reminder, albeit suburban, of the functionality of the path.

The path continues to follow the cement colonnade of the M4. On either side of the path are access points from Harris Park. Near the junction of Parramatta Road, Church Street, and Woodville Road, where the M4 passes over the junction, the cycleway provides various spur options: the north to Parramatta central business district via High, Wigram, or Railway Streets; and to the south to Merrylands and  via Woodville Road and adjacent side-streets. The A'Becketts Creek Community Street Library sits along the path at Junction Street. The guerilla street library was created by local residents in May 2021 and aims to foster a sense of community along the M4 corridor.

Parramatta to Wentworthville
Continuing west and after crossing Burnett Street, the cycleway joins Rita Street where it provides a spur option to the north via an underpass to access Rees and Peggy Streets and then north to Parramatta Park. The cycleway crosses Coleman Street, Merrylands and continues west before reaching a junction with Allen Street and the Finlayson Creek. Here, a spur line to the north passes under the M4 and provides access to a road crossing of the Great Western Highway and the Wentworthville shopping centre. Another spur line follows Finlayson Creek to the south, with local access to Merrylands.

Continuing  further west, the cycleway terminates at a junction near the Old Prospect Road on the boundary between Merrylands, South Wentworthville, Greystanes and Pendle Hill, where the cycleway seamlessly joins the Liverpool–Parramatta T-way.

Cycleway use
In the twelve months to February 2014, between 30 and 40 cyclists used the M4 cyclepath at Holroyd West on an average weekday.

See also
Bike paths in Sydney
Cycling in New South Wales
Cycling in Sydney

References

External links
Bicycle NSW website
City of Sydney - Cycling

Cycleways in Australia
Cycling in Sydney
Transport infrastructure in Parramatta